Armin Muzaferija (born 1 December 1988) is a Bosnian singer. His most popular songs are “Studen vodo”, "Vulkani", "Tvom Resulu" and "Džehva".

Biography
Armin Muzaferija was born on 1 December 1988 in Visoko, SFR Yugoslavia, present-day Bosnia and Herzegovina. He comes from a prominent Bosniak family. In 2000, he was awarded the Most Promising Young Interpreter Award at the Zenica Traditional Music Festival (that marks his music career beginning). In 2001, Armin won the same festival, followed by many awards at local and regional young talent competitions. In the late summer of 2007, Muzaferija went to study English in the UK, where he attended the prestigious Cambridge University. Upon his return, he enrolled at the Faculty of Economics, University of Sarajevo. In 2007, Armin collaborated with the Bosnian singer-songwriter Hari Varešanović, who authored and arranged the song "Još te volim" (I Still Love You), and with whom Muzaferija performed at the 2007 Melody of Mostar Festival and won the second jury award. Appearing at the 2007 Sunny Scales in Herceg Novi with the song "Povedi me" (Take Me), signed by Varešanović and Fahrudin Pecikoza, he won the high fifth place in the strong competition. In Croatia, Muzaferija performed on "Evening of Sevdah" in Zagreb, Rijeka and Pula. He was also part of a big tour honoring the legendary Indexi, where he performed with music veterans: Hari Varešanović, Aki Rahimovski, Mladen Vojičić Tifa, Željko Bebek, Teška Industrija and other notable names. Muzaferija performed at the 12th Croatian Radio Festival in 2008, where he was awarded two awards for his song "Where My Love Sleeps" in this large competition. In addition to his music career, Muzaferija also made his first acting role in the short documentary feature film Marimaga, premiered as part of the "Sarajevo that is gone" (Sarajevo kojeg više nema) event. In addition to appearing in the film, Muzaferija sang the sevdalinka "Kad ja pođoh na Bentbašu" (When I went to Bentbash) which is also the soundtrack of the film.

On 16 July 2015 (day before Eid al-Fitr 2015), Muzaferija performed on a Bijeljina manifestation "Ramadan in Bosnia". On 12 August 2019 (2nd day of Eid al-Adha 2019), Muzaferija was the main performer on Zenica city-square concert entitled "Eid solemnity". and during Eid concerts.

Professor of music and music producer, Mehmed Bajraktarević, Bosnian singer-songwriter Eldin Huseinbegović, singer Armin Muzaferija and singer Lamija Kadić, with the support of Hayat Production, contributed to the fight for investigating Dženan Memić's death (young man who died in a controversial conditions) by the congratulatory for Memić family (to prove the truth and satisfy justice regarding the death); they expressed their support with a song called "Voljenom odlaze voljeni" (Beloved Goes to The Beloved).

Muzaferija represented  in the Turkvision Song Contest 2020 with the song "Džehva". The song placed third out of 26 entries with 194 points.

He is married and has three children with his wife.

Discography
Studio albums
Još te volim (I Still Love You; Hit Records, 2009)
Na srcu potpisan (Signed at the Heart; Hayat Production, 2015)

Singles

"Gdje mi ljubav spava" (Where My Love Sleeps, 2008)
"Ne mogu da te ne volim" (I Can't Not To Love You, 2009)
"Šehidi" (Shahids, 2010)
"Od Mašrika do Magriba" (From Mashriq to Maghreb, 2011)
"Putujem" (I Travel, 2011)
"Allahu Allah" (Allah Allah, 2012)
"S tobom bez tebe" (With You Without You, 2012)
"Sa tvojih usana" (From Your Lips, 2013)
"Sultan" (Sultan, 2013)
"Gdje si ti" (Where Are You, 2015)
"Samo ti" (Only You, 2016)
"Biću tu" (I'll Be There, 2018)
"Tvom Resulu" (To Your Resulla, 2018)
"Džehva" (2018)
"Voljenom odlaze voljeni" (Beloved Goes To Beloved, 2019)
"Studen vodo" (Cold Water, 2021)

References

Further reading

External links

1988 births
Living people
People from Visoko
21st-century Bosnia and Herzegovina male singers
Keyboardists
Dervish
Alumni of the University of Cambridge
University of Sarajevo alumni
Bosniaks of Bosnia and Herzegovina
Bosnia and Herzegovina Muslims
Turkvision Song Contest entrants